The Federal Office of Administration (BVA) is an agency of the Federal Ministry of the Interior, headquartered in Cologne.

Agencies
  Central Agency for German Schools Abroad (ZfA)

Reference notes

External links
 Federal Office of Administration
  Federal Office of Administration

German federal agencies